Wyatt Durrette (born 1938) is an American attorney and politician, who served in the Virginia House of Representatives.

Wyatt Durrette may also refer to:

Wyatt Durrette (songwriter), born Wyatt B. Durrette III, American country music songwriter